Ivan Aleksandrovich Lyubeznov (19 April (2 May) 1909, in Astrakhan – 5 March 1988, in Moscow) was a Russian theater and film actor, reader during the rule of the Soviet Union.

Personal life 
He married Marina Ladynina (1908–2003), an actress and a classmate. She studied under film director Ivan Pyryev.

He died in Moscow on 5 March 1988, aged 79, and is interred in Vagankovo Cemetery.

Selected filmography
 The Lonely White Sail (1937)
 The Rich Bride (1937)
 The Law of Life (1940)
 Yakov Sverdlov (1940)
 Alexander Parkhomenko (1942)
 Six P.M. (1944)
 Hello Moscow! (1945)
 For Those Who Are at Sea (1947)
 Encounter at the Elbe (1949)
 Hostile Whirlwinds (1953)
 Good Morning (1955)

Recognition 

 People's Artist of the USSR (1970)
 Laureate of the Stalin Prize of the second degree (1946)

References

External links 
 
 
 

1988 deaths
Burials at Vagankovo Cemetery
1909 births
Soviet male actors
Stalin Prize winners
Recipients of the Order of Lenin
People from Astrakhan
Male actors from Moscow